Town Creek is a tributary of the Tred Avon River in Talbot County on Maryland's Eastern Shore.

Geography
The headwaters are located in Oxford and the creek flows north  to the Tred Avon River, which drains to the Choptank River and the Chesapeake Bay.

See also
List of Maryland rivers
Town Creek (Patuxent River)
Town Creek (Potomac River)

References

Tributaries of the Chesapeake Bay
Rivers of Maryland
Rivers of Talbot County, Maryland